Martin Sus (born 15 March 1990) is a Czech footballer who plays as a right-back for Czech club Příbram. He has represented his country at youth level.

Career

Opava
After a year of very successful engagement in Slovakia, Sus returned to Czech Republic and signed a one-year contract with SFC Opava on 3 September 2019.

Stal Mielec
On 4 September 2020, he joined Ekstraklasa club Stal Mielec.

Honours
 Slovan Liberec
Czech Cup: 2014–15

References

External links

1990 births
Living people
People from Benešov
Czech footballers
Association football defenders
Czech expatriate footballers
Czech Republic youth international footballers
Czech First League players
Czech National Football League players
Slovak Super Liga players
Ekstraklasa players
AC Sparta Prague players
FC Sellier & Bellot Vlašim players
1. FK Příbram players
FC Slovan Liberec players
FC Baník Ostrava players
FK Mladá Boleslav players
ŠKF Sereď players
SFC Opava players
Stal Mielec players
Czech expatriate sportspeople in Slovakia
Czech expatriate sportspeople in Poland
Expatriate footballers in Slovakia
Expatriate footballers in Poland
Sportspeople from the Central Bohemian Region